Rafael Ángel Ortega García (born May 15, 1991) is a Venezuelan professional baseball outfielder in the New York Yankees organization. He previously played in MLB for the Colorado Rockies, Los Angeles Angels, Miami Marlins, Atlanta Braves and Chicago Cubs.

Career

Colorado Rockies
On January 30, 2008, Ortega was signed as an amateur free agent by the Colorado Rockies. He made his professional debut with the Dominican Summer League Rockies. In 2009, Ortega remained with the DSL Rockies, slashing .324/.395/.414 in 70 games. In 2010, he played with the rookie ball Casper Ghosts, batting .358/.426/.510 with 7 home runs and 45 RBI. The next year, Ortega played for the Single-A Asheville Tourists, hitting .294/.335/.438 with 9 home runs and 66 RBI. He began the 2012 season with the High-A Modesto Nuts, and hit .283 in 114 games for the team. Ortega made his major league debut with the Rockies on September 30, 2012. He spent the 2013 season with the Double-A Tulsa Drillers, slashing .228/.315/.297 in 42 games.

Texas Rangers
Ortega was claimed off waivers by the Texas Rangers on November 27, 2013. The Rangers designated Ortega for assignment on December 30, 2013.

St. Louis Cardinals
The St. Louis Cardinals claimed Ortega on January 6, 2014. He was assigned to the Double-A Springfield Cardinals to begin the year. On September 8, 2014, Ortega was designated for assignment by St. Louis. He was outrighted to the Triple-A Memphis Redbirds on September 10. He spent the 2015 season in Memphis, batting .286/.367/.378 with 2 home runs and 42 RBI. On November 6, 2015, he elected free agency.

Los Angeles Angels
The Los Angeles Angels of Anaheim signed Ortega to a one-year, major league contract on December 1, 2015. Ortega made the team out of spring training as a fourth outfielder. After injuries to their starting left fielders, Ortega was entrenched as the Angels left fielder. In 36 games, he hit .236 and only struck out 16 times in 122 at bats. On June 11, Ortega was sent down to Triple-A. On November 11, 2016, Ortega was designated for assignment by the Angels. He elected free agency on November 18.

San Diego Padres
On December 13, 2016, Ortega signed a minor league contract with the San Diego Padres. He spent the 2017 season with the Triple-A El Paso Chihuahuas, posting a .317/.383/.468 batting line with 4 home runs and 31 RBI. On November 6, 2017, he elected free agency.

Miami Marlins
Ortega signed a minor league contract with the Miami Marlins on December 15, 2017. He was assigned to the Triple-A New Orleans Baby Cakes to begin the year. On August 10, 2018, Ortega was selected to the active roster. He hit .233/.287/.271 with 7 RBI in 41 games for Miami. On October 12, 2018, Ortega was outrighted off of the 40-man roster. He elected free agency on October 17, 2018.

Atlanta Braves
On November 19, 2018, Ortega signed a minor league deal with the Atlanta Braves that included an invitation to spring training. He was assigned to the Triple-A Gwinnett Stripers to begin the season. On August 13, 2019, the Braves selected his contract. Ortega hit his second career home run, a grand slam against Los Angeles Dodgers pitcher Dustin May, on August 18, 2019. He hit .205/.271/.307 with 2 home runs and 10 RBI in 34 games for Atlanta. He was included in the Braves' NLDS roster as the Braves fell to the St. Louis Cardinals in 5 games. Ortega was non-tendered on December 2, 2019, and became a free agent. On December 10, he re-signed with Atlanta on a minor league contract. Ortega did not play in a game in 2020 due to the cancellation of the minor league season because of the COVID-19 pandemic. He became a free agent on November 2, 2020.

Chicago Cubs
On February 12, 2021, Ortega signed a minor league deal with the Cubs which included an invitation to major-league spring training. Ortega did not make the Cubs opening day roster. He was however selected to the alternate site roster in South Bend, preceding the start of the delayed Minor League Baseball season. On May 26, 2021, Ortega was selected to the active roster. In his regular-season Cubs debut against the Pittsburgh Pirates, Ortega went 1 for 3 with a walk and a run scored. On May 29, 2021, Ortega hit both his first home run of the 2021 season and as a Cub against Ryan Hendrix of the Cincinnati Reds. In the month of July, Ortega hit .368/.419/.500 including a .378/.429/.578 slash-line following the All-Star break. On July 31, 2021, Ortega hit his third home run of the year against Joe Ross of the Washington Nationals, the most home runs he's ever hit in one season. On August 1, 2021, Ortega continued his hot streak hitting three home runs in one game, tying the club record and becoming just the 43rd Cub to do so. On August 23, 2021, Ortega ended the Cubs franchise record 13-game home losing streak at Wrigley Field with a walk-off 2-run home run against Daniel Bard of the Colorado Rockies. On August 25, 2021, Ortega stole home as a part of a double steal with Ian Happ. He became the first Cubs player to steal home since Billy Hamilton did so on September 27, 2020, also part of a double steal. On August 28, 2021, during the Crosstown Classic, Ortega hit a grand slam against Lance Lynn of the Chicago White Sox as a part of the Cubs' 7–0 victory. Ortega finished the 2021 season batting .291/.360/.463 with 11 home runs, 33 RBIs and 12 stolen bases in a career-high 103 games.

On November 18, 2022, Ortega was non tendered and became a free agent.

New York Yankees
On January 3, 2023, Ortega signed a minor league deal with the New York Yankees.

See also

 List of Major League Baseball players from Venezuela

References

External links

1991 births
Living people
Asheville Tourists players
Atlanta Braves players
Caribes de Anzoátegui players
Casper Ghosts players
Chicago Cubs players
Colorado Rockies players
Dominican Summer League Rockies players
Venezuelan expatriate baseball players in the Dominican Republic
El Paso Chihuahuas players
Gulf Coast Cardinals players
Gwinnett Stripers players
Los Angeles Angels players
Major League Baseball outfielders
Major League Baseball players from Venezuela
Memphis Redbirds players
Miami Marlins players
Modesto Nuts players
New Orleans Baby Cakes players
Salt Lake Bees players
Springfield Cardinals players
Tiburones de La Guaira players
Tulsa Drillers players
Venezuelan expatriate baseball players in the United States
People from El Tigre